Ruben Carter may refer to:

 Rubin "Hurricane" Carter (1937–2014), middleweight boxer wrongfully convicted of murder
 Ruben Carter (American football) (born 1992), American football offensive lineman
 Rubin Carter (American football) (born 1952), American football coach and player